"Invictus" is a short poem by the Victorian era British poet William Ernest Henley (1849–1903). It was written in 1875 and published in 1888 in his first volume of poems, Book of Verses, in the section Life and Death (Echoes).

Background 

When Henley was 16 years old, his left leg required amputation owing to complications arising from tuberculosis. In the early 1870s, after seeking treatment for problems with his other leg at Margate, he was told that it would require a similar procedure.

He instead chose to travel to Edinburgh in August 1873 to enlist the services of the distinguished English surgeon Joseph Lister, who was able to save Henley's remaining leg after multiple surgical interventions on the foot. While recovering in the infirmary, he was moved to write the verses that became the poem "Invictus". A memorable evocation of Victorian stoicism—the "stiff upper lip" of self-discipline and fortitude in adversity, which popular culture rendered into a British character trait—"Invictus" remains a cultural touchstone.

Poem 

Out of the night that covers me
Black as the pit from pole to pole,
I thank whatever gods may be
For my unconquerable soul.

In the fell clutch of circumstance,
I have not winced nor cried aloud.
Under the bludgeonings of chance
My head is bloody, but unbowed.

Beyond this place of wrath and tears
Looms but the Horror of the shade,
And yet the menace of the years
Finds, and shall find, me unafraid.

It matters not how strait the gate,
How charged with punishments the scroll,
I am the master of my fate
I am the captain of my soul.

Analysis 
Latin for "unconquered", the poem "Invictus" is a deeply descriptive and motivational work filled with vivid imagery. With four stanzas and sixteen lines, each containing eight syllables, the poem has a rather uncomplicated structure. The poem is most known for its themes of willpower and strength in the face of adversity, much of which is drawn from the horrible fate assigned to many amputees of the day—gangrene and death.

Each stanza takes considerable note of William Ernest Henley's perseverance and fearlessness throughout his early life and over twenty months under Lister's care. In the second stanza, Henley refers to the strength that helped him through a childhood defined by his struggles with tuberculosis when he says "I have not winced nor cried aloud." In the fourth stanza, Henley alludes to the fact that each individual's destiny is under the jurisdiction of themselves, not at the mercy of the obstacles they face, nor other worldly powers.

Those who have taken time to analyze "Invictus" have also taken notice of religious themes, or the lack thereof, that exist in this piece. There is agreement that much of the dark descriptions in the opening lines make reference to Hell. Later, the fourth stanza of the poem alludes to a phrase from the King James Bible, which says, at Matthew 7:14, "Because strait is the gate, and narrow is the way, which leadeth unto life, and few there be that find it."

Despite Henley's evocative tellings of perseverance and determination, worry was on his mind; in a letter to a close companion, William Ernest Henley later confided, "I am afeard my marching days are over" when asked about the condition of his leg.

Publication history

The second edition of Henley's Book of Verses added a dedication "To R. T. H. B."—a reference to Robert Thomas Hamilton Bruce, a successful Scottish flour merchant, baker, and literary patron. The 1900 edition of Henley's Poems, published after Bruce's death, altered the dedication to "I. M. R. T. Hamilton Bruce (1846–1899)," whereby I. M. stands for "in memoriam."

Title 
The poem was published in 1888 in his first volume of poems, Book of Verses, with no title, but would later be reprinted in 19th-century newspapers under various titles, including:
 "Myself"
 "Song of a Strong Soul"
 "My Soul"
 "Clear Grit"
 "Master of His Fate"
 "Captain of My Soul"
 "Urbs Fortitudinis"
 "De Profundis"

The established title "Invictus" was added by editor Arthur Quiller-Couch when the poem was included in the Oxford Book of English Verse (1900).

Notable uses

History
 In a speech to the House of Commons on 9 September 1941, Winston Churchill paraphrased the last two lines of the poem, stating "We are still masters of our fate. We still are captains of our souls."
 Nelson Mandela, while incarcerated at Robben Island prison, recited the poem to other prisoners and was empowered by its message of self-mastery.
 Burmese opposition leader and Nobel Peace laureate Aung San Suu Kyi stated: "This poem had inspired my father, Aung San, and his contemporaries during the independence struggle, as it also seemed to have inspired freedom fighters in other places at other times."
 The poem was read by U.S. prisoners of war during the Vietnam War. James Stockdale recalls being passed the last stanza, written with rat droppings on toilet paper, from fellow prisoner David Hatcher.
 The phrase "bloody, but unbowed" was the headline used by the Daily Mirror on the day after the 7 July 2005 London bombings.
 The poem's last stanza was quoted by U.S. President Barack Obama at the end of his speech at the memorial service of Nelson Mandela in South Africa (10 December 2013), and published on the front cover of the 14 December 2013 issue of The Economist.
 The poem was chosen by Oklahoma City bomber Timothy McVeigh as his final statement before his execution. The perpetrator of the  Christchurch mosque shootings in New Zealand in 2019 also cited "Invictus".
 According to his sister, before becoming a civil rights leader, Congressman John Lewis used to recite the poem as a teenager and continued to refer to it for inspiration throughout his life.
 Verse "Out of the night that covers me" and phrases "Bloody, but unbowed" and "Captain of my soul" are used as titles of all three parts of Prince Harry's memoir Spare (published in 2023). The poem is also mentioned as the author reminiscens his involvement in the Invictus Games.

Literature 
 In Oscar Wilde's De Profundis letter in 1897, he reminisces that "I was no longer the Captain of my soul."
 In Book Five, chapter III ("The Self-Sufficiency of Vertue") of his early autobiographical work, The Pilgrim's Regress (1933), C. S. Lewis included a quote from the last two lines (paraphrased by the character Vertue): "I cannot put myself under anyone's orders. I must be the captain of my soul and the master of my fate. But thank you for your offer."
 In W. E. B. Du Bois' The Quest of the Silver Fleece, the last stanza is sent anonymously from one character to another to encourage him to stay strong in the face of tests to his manhood.
 The phrase "bloody, but unbowed" was quoted by Lord Peter Wimsey in Dorothy Sayers' novel Clouds of Witness (1926), referring to his failure to exonerate his brother of the charge of murder.
 The last line in the poem is used as the title for Gwen Harwood's 1960 poem "I am the Captain of My Soul", which presents a different view of the titular captain.

Film 
 In Casablanca (1942), Captain Renault (played by Claude Rains) recites the last two lines of the poem when talking to Rick Blaine (played by Humphrey Bogart), referring to his power in Casablanca. While delivering the last line, he is called away by an aide to Gestapo officer Major Strasser.
 In Kings Row (1942), psychiatrist Parris Mitchell (played by Robert Cummings) recites the first two stanzas of "Invictus" to his friend Drake McHugh (played by Ronald Reagan) before revealing to Drake that his legs were unnecessarily amputated by a cruel doctor.
 In Sunrise at Campobello (1960), the character Louis Howe (played by Hume Cronyn) reads the poem to Franklin D. Roosevelt (played by Ralph Bellamy). The recitation is at first light-hearted and partially in jest, but as it continues both men appear to realize the significance of the poem to Roosevelt's fight against his paralytic illness.
 Nelson Mandela is depicted in Invictus (2009) presenting a copy of the poem to Francois Pienaar, captain of the national South African rugby team, for inspiration during the Rugby World Cup—though at the actual event he gave Pienaar a text of "The Man in the Arena" passage from Theodore Roosevelt's Citizenship in a Republic speech delivered in France in 1910.
 The last two lines "I am the master of my fate: I am the captain of my soul" are shown in a picture during the 25th minute of the film The Big Short (2015).
 Star Trek: Renegades (2015) opens with Lexxa Singh reciting the poem and writing it on the wall of her prison cell.

Television 
 In the 5th episode of the 2nd season of Archer, "The Double Deuce" (2011), Woodhouse describes Reggie as "in the words of Henley, 'bloody, but unbowed'".
 In the 8th episode of the 5th season of TV series The Blacklist, "Ian Garvey", Raymond 'Red' Reddington (played by James Spader) reads the poem to Elizabeth Keen when she wakes up from a ten-month coma.
 In the 6th episode of the third season of One Tree Hill, "Locked Hearts & Hand Grenades" (2006), Lucas Scott (played by Chad Michael Murray) references the poem in an argument with Haley James Scott (played by Bethany Joy Lenz) over his heart condition and playing basketball. The episode ends with Lucas reading the whole poem over a series of images that link the various characters to the themes of the poem.
 In season 1, episode 2 of New Amsterdam, "Ritual", Dr. Floyd Reynolds (played by Jocko Sims) references the poem while prepping hands for surgery prior to a conversation with his fellow doctor Dr. Lauren Bloom (played by Janet Montgomery).
 In the episode "Interlude" of the series The Lieutenant, the lead character and the woman he is infatuated with jointly recite the poem after she has said it is her favorite poem.  His reciting is flawed by lapses, which she fills in.
 In season 4, episode 14 of New Amsterdam, "...Unto the Breach", Dr. Floyd Reynolds (played by Jocko Sims) recites the poem while prepping for surgery.
 In season 1, episode 3 of Hulu's Nine Perfect Strangers Napoleon Marconi (played by Michael Shannon) references the poem in his one-on-one with Masha (played by Nicole Kidman) when referring to his son who died by suicide. Napoleon states, "Zach chose to be the master of his fate" referencing the line "I am the master of my fate; I am the captain of my soul" by Henley.
 In episode 22, season 5 of 30 Rock“Everything Sunny All the Time Always”, Jack Donaghy quotes the last two lines of the poem in to Liz Lemon.

Sports 
 Jerry Kramer recited the poem during his NFL Pro Football Hall of Fame induction speech.
 The Invictus Games—an international Paralympic-style multi-sport event created by Prince Harry in which wounded, injured or sick armed services personnel and their associated veterans take part in sport—has featured the poem in its promotions. Prior to the inaugural games in London in 2014, entertainers including Daniel Craig and Tom Hardy, and athletes including Louis Smith and Iwan Thomas, read the poem in a promotional video.

Video games 
 The second stanza is recited by Lieutenant-Commander Ashley Williams in the 2012 video game Mass Effect 3
 The game Sunless Sea features an "Invictus Token" for players who forgo the right to create backups of their current game state. The item text includes the last two lines of the poem.
 The poem was recited in an early commercial for the Microsoft Xbox One.
 The game Robotics;Notes features the last two lines of the poem in its epigraph.

Music 
 The lines "I am the master of my fate... I am the captain of my soul" are paraphrased in Lana Del Rey's song "Lust for Life" featuring The Weeknd. The lyrics are changed from "I" to "we," alluding to a relationship.
 Belgian Black / Folk Metal band Ancient Rites use the poem as a song on their album Rvbicon (Latin form of Rubicon)

See also 

 If—, Rudyard Kipling
 The Man in the Arena, Theodore Roosevelt
 "Let No Charitable Hope," Elinor Wylie
 Agency (philosophy)

References

External links

 
 The original untitled poem in Henley's A Book of Verses at Google Books.

1888 poems
Victorian poetry